The Oakville Blades are a Junior "A" ice hockey team from Oakville, Ontario, Canada.  They are a part of the Ontario Junior Hockey League.

History
The Blades started as a Junior C team, and made it to the Clarence Schmalz Cup Final once to compete for the All-Ontario Junior "C" title.  In 1969, the Blades lost 4-games-to-3 to the Woodstock Navy-Vets.  Oakville moved up to the Junior B level for the 1970-71 season, and joined the Mid-Ontario Junior B league.  In 1971, the leagues realigned, and Oakville moved to the new Central Junior B league.  In 1975 and 1991 the Blades made it the Sutherland Cup Final for the All-Ontario Junior "B" title.  The first time, they were defeated by the Metro Junior B Hockey League's Bramalea Blues 4-games-to-3.  The second time, they were defeated by the Midwestern Junior B Hockey League's Waterloo Siskins 4-games-to-0. Oakville became a Junior A team in the mid 1990s and ever since they played in the Ontario Junior Hockey League Buckland Cup Final five times, winning three Buckland Cups in franchise history.

2007-08 season
The Blades had a great 2007-08 regular season.  With 39 wins, 6 losses, and 4 overtime losses, the Blades finished first overall in the West Division.  After a bye in the division quarter-final, the Blades defeated the Milton Icehawks 4-games-to-1 in the division semi-final and Georgetown Raiders 4-games-to-1 to win the West Division playoff title.  In the North/West Conference championship, the Blades took on the defending Royal Bank Cup 2007 champion Aurora Tigers.  The Tigers appeared dominant, but faltered late in the series to lose to the Blades 4-games-to-2.  In the OPJHL Buckland Cup final, Blades dominated the Markham Waxers and won 4-games-to-1 to win their first ever Junior A league championship.

The Blades then moved on to the Dudley Hewitt Cup, the Central Canadian championship.  In game 1, the Blades defeated the Thunder Bay Region champion Dryden Ice Dogs 5-1.  The then defeated the Northern Ontario champion Sudbury Jr. Wolves 5-3.  In the final game of the round robin, they defeated the host Newmarket Hurricanes 5-2.  This gave the Blades a bye to the final where they played the Hurricanes again and beat them 6-3.  This earned them a berth into the 2008 Royal Bank Cup.

The 2008 campaign got rocky when the Blades shipped off to Cornwall, Ontario for the Royal Bank Cup.  Star goaltender Scott Greenham could not attend the tournament despite leading the Blades to the OPJHL and Central Canadian Championships.  Having accepted a scholarship to play for the Alaska Nanooks, he would lose his NCAA eligibility if he played in the Royal Bank Cup because his age (21).  With this, the Blades had to bring their back-up cold off the bench for the national championship.  In the first game of the tournament, Oakville had to play the host Cornwall Colts of the Central Junior A Hockey League.  Despite outshooting them, the Blades were shocked by the Colts 5-4.  The next night, the Blades drew the Weeks Crushers of the Maritime Junior A Hockey League.  The Blades badly outshot the Crushers, but the Crushers managed to squeak out a 4-3 overtime victory of the Central Canadian champions.  In a nail-biting and high scoring outing, the Blades gave Humboldt a 7-6 loss to keep contention for a playoff spot in the tournament.  It was not to be though, as the Blades out-shot but still lost to the top ranked Camrose Kodiaks 6-1.

Despite outshooting all four of their opponents, the Oakville Blades lost three out of four games and were eliminated on a head-to-head tie breaker with Weeks.

2018-2019 season
The Oakville Blades had their best season yet in franchise history, winning the OJHL, the Dudley-Hewitt Cup, and coming in third place going to the semi finals at the National Jr. A Hockey Championship, the furthest they have got at the national tournament. The Blades finished with the highest wins ever, and tied for most points in club history.

Team includes: Spencer Kersten, Peyton Reeves "C", Jack Ricketts "A", Thomas Maia, Josh Nixon, Harrison Israels, Kyle Potts, Kyle Lewis, Jason Pineo, Callum Jones "A", Garrett Pyke "A", Alton McDermott, Ryan Nicholson, Nicholas Aromatario, Ryan O'Hara, Holden Doggett, Tyler Amaral, Jack Lyons, Tanner McEachern, Christian Girhiny, Nathan Ribau, Cameron Hatziioannou, Will Barber, Chris Elliot.

Staff: Mike Tarantino (head coach), Rob Bentivegna (assistant coach), Ryan Hunter (assistant coach), Mark Edwards (assistant coach), Jordan Selinger (general manager), Cole Crane (Assistant GM), Craig Clayton (head equipment manager), Natalie Figueria (trainer), Nicholas Fiore (Play by Play Broadcaster), Matthew Ahmadzai (Colour Commentator), John Cole (Camera Man)

Season-by-season results

National Jr. A Championship appearances
2008: 5th Place - 1-3-0 Record
Host city: Cornwall, Ontario
Defeated by Cornwall Colts (CCHL) 5-4
Defeated by Pictou County Crushers (MJAHL) 4-3
Defeated by Camrose Kodiaks (AJHL) 6-1
Won vs. Humboldt Broncos (SJHL) 7-6
2010: 5th Place - 0-3-1 Record
Host city: Dauphin, Manitoba
Defeated by La Ronge Ice Wolves (SJHL) 3-2 OT
Defeated by Brockville Braves (CCHL) 11-2
Defeated by Vernon Vipers (BCHL) 5-3
Defeated by Dauphin Kings (MJHL) 5-4
2019: Lost in Semifinal - 2-3-0 Record
Host city: Brooks, Alberta
Defeated by Brooks Bandits (AJHL) 7-3
Defeated by Prince George Spruce Kings (BCHL) 5-1
Won vs. Portage Terriers (MJHL) 5-4
Won vs. Ottawa Jr. Senators (CCHL) 7-4
Defeated by Prince George Spruce Kings (BCHL) 2-1 in semifinal

Dudley Hewitt Cup appearances
The Dudley Hewitt Cup represents the Central Canadian Junior A championship.  The winner moves on to the Centennial Cup National Junior A championship.

2008: Won Championship - 4-0-0 Record
Host city: Newmarket, Ontario
Won vs. Dryden Ice Dogs (SIJHL) 5-1
Won vs. Sudbury Jr. Wolves (NOJHL) 5-3
Won vs. Newmarket Hurricanes (OPJHL) 5-2
Won vs. Newmarket Hurricanes (OPJHL) 6-3 in final
2010: Won Championship - 4-0-0 Record
Host city: Sault Ste. Marie, Ontario
Won vs. Fort William North Stars (SIJHL) 2-1 OT
Won vs. Abitibi Eskimos (NOJHL) 6-0
Won vs. Soo Thunderbirds (NOJHL) 3-1
Won vs. Fort William North Stars (SIJHL) 2-1 in final
2019: Won Championship - 4-0-0 Record
Host city: Cochrane, Ontario
Won vs. Thunder Bay North Stars (SIJHL) 9-4
Won vs. Hearst Lumberjacks (NOJHL) 4-2
Won vs. Cochrane Crunch (NOJHL) 6-2
Won vs. Hearst Lumberjacks (NOJHL) 2-0 in final

Sutherland Cup appearances
1975: Bramalea Blues defeated Oakville Blades 4-games-to-3
1991: Waterloo Siskins defeated Oakville Blades 4-games-to-none

Clarence Schmalz Cup appearances
1969: Woodstock Navy-Vets defeated Oakville Blades 4-games-to-3

References

External links
Blades Webpage

Oakville, Ontario
Ontario Provincial Junior A Hockey League teams